Finnlakeviridae is a family of bacterial viruses that is not assigned to any higher taxonomic ranks. The family contains a single genus, Finnlakevirus, which contains a single species, Flavobacterium virus FLiP. This virus was isolated in 2010, with its gram-negative host bacterium, from Lake Jyväsjärvi, a boreal freshwater habitat in Central Finland, and is the first described single-stranded DNA virus with an internal membrane. 

The genome is circular single-stranded DNA of about 9200 nucleotides in length.

References

External links
 ICTV Report: Finnlakeviridae
 PNAS Paper: Finnlakeviridae

Virus families